Nell Freudenberger (born 1975, in New York City) is an American novelist, essayist, and short-story writer.

Education
Freudenberger graduated from Harvard and has traveled extensively in Asia.

Career

Fiction
Freudenberger's fiction has appeared in Granta, The Paris Review, and The New Yorker. After her collection Lucky Girls was published in 2003, she received the PEN/Malamud Award, a short story prize sponsored by PEN International. When Freudenberger's novel The Dissident appeared in 2006, she received the Janet Heidinger Kafka Prize for Fiction.

In June 2010, Freudenberger was featured along with fellow writers Chimamanda Ngozi Adichie, Karen Russell, ZZ Packer, and Gary Shteyngart in The New Yorker's "20 Under 40 Fiction" issue. Per the magazine, these authors represented "Twenty young writers who capture the inventiveness and the vitality of contemporary American fiction." The list received widespread media attention.

Journalism
Freudenberger's travel writing has been published in Travel + Leisure, Salon, The New Yorker, and The Telegraph Magazine. She has written book reviews for The New York Times, The New Yorker, Vogue and The Nation.

Personal life
Freudenberger is married and has two children. The family lives in Brooklyn.

Awards
2010 The New Yorker, "20 Under 40" Fiction Issue
2010 Guggenheim Fellowship
2006 Janet Heidinger Kafka Prize
2005 Whiting Award for fiction
2004 PEN/Malamud Award for short fiction

Works

Books
 Lucky Girls, Ecco/HarperCollins 2003, 
 The Dissident, Ecco/HarperCollins 2006, 
 The Newlyweds, Knopf 2012, 
 Lost and Wanted, Knopf 2019,

Short stories and essays
 (Subscription Required)

 (Subscription Required)

References

External links
Profile at The Whiting Foundation

The Dissident Reviews & Scores at Metacritic.com
"Nell Freudenberger", Charlie Rose

American short story writers
American travel writers
1975 births
Living people
Harvard University alumni
PEN/Malamud Award winners
Writers from New York City
American women travel writers
21st-century American women